Sandy Buckle (11 November 1891 – 4 June 1982) was an Australian cricketer. He played one first-class match for New South Wales in 1913/14.

See also
 List of New South Wales representative cricketers

References

External links
 

1891 births
1982 deaths
Australian cricketers
New South Wales cricketers
Cricketers from Sydney